Çankırı District (also: Merkez, meaning "central") is a district of the Çankırı Province of Turkey. Its seat is the city of Çankırı. Its area is 1,440 km2, and its population is 100,027 (2021).

Composition
There is one municipality in Çankırı District:
 Çankırı

There are 50 villages in Çankırı District:

 Ağzıbüyük 
 Ahlat 
 Akçavakıf 
 Akören 
 Alaçat 
 Alıca 
 Altınlı 
 Aşağıçavuş 
 Aşağıpelitözü 
 Aşağıyanlar 
 Ayan 
 Balıbağı 
 Başeğmez 
 Bayındır 
 Beştut 
 Bozkır 
 Çağabey 
 Çatalelma 
 Çayırpınar 
 Çırçır 
 Çiviköy 
 Danabaşı
 Dedeköy 
 Değim
 Doğantepe 
 Dutağaç
 Germece
 Handırı
 Hasakça
 Hıdırlık
 İçyenice
 İnaç
 İnandık
 İncik
 Karadayı
 Karaşeyh
 Kuzuköy 
 Küçüklü 
 Merzi 
 Ovacık 
 Paşaköy 
 Pehlivanlı 
 Satıyüzü 
 Süleymanlı 
 Taytak
 Tüney 
 Tuzlu 
 Ünür 
 Yukarıçavuş 
 Yukarıpelitözü

References

Districts of Çankırı Province